The Thoại Hà Canal is a canal of southwestern Vietnam. It flows through An Giang Province and Kiên Giang Province.

References 

Rivers of An Giang province
Rivers of Kiên Giang province
Canals in Vietnam
Rivers of Vietnam